The Nipukatasi River is a tributary of the Broadback River flowing west to Rupert Bay, south of James Bay. The Nipukatasi River flows in the municipality of Eeyou Istchee Baie-James (municipality), in the administrative region of Nord-du-Québec, in Quebec, in Canada.

Geography 
The surrounding hydrographic slopes of the Nipukatasi River are:
North side: Broadback River;
East side: Amisquioumisca lake, Caminscanane lake;
South side: Opataouaga Lake, Poncheville Lake, Maicasagi River;
West side: Lake Quenonisca, Lake Salamander, Evans Lake.

A small unnamed lake (length: ,) is the head of the Nipukatasi River.

Course downstream of the head lake 
( segment)
 
From this head lake, the Nipukatasi River flows  to the northeast more or less parallel to the west shore of Morain Lake. The river flows on the north shore of Amisquioumisca Lake as the current flows  to the southwest.

Segment downstream from Amisquioumisca lake 
( segment)
 
Amisquioumisca Lake is the main body of water on the Nipukatasi River. Its mouth is located southwest of the lake.
 
From the mouth of this lake, the Nipukatasi River first flows  to the west. The river branches north to flow  to a dump from the east. In its last segment, the river flows  to the northeast crossing a lake (length: ,).
 
The Nipukatasi River flows on the south shore of the Broadback River upstream of Quenonisca Lake.

Toponymy
The toponym Nipukatasi River was formalized on December 5, 1968, at the Commission de toponymie du Québec.

See also 

James Bay
Rupert Bay
Broadback River, a watercourse
Eeyou Istchee James Bay (municipality)
Jamésie
List of rivers of Quebec

References

External links 
Fact heet of the Commission de toponymie du Québec

Rivers of Nord-du-Québec
Eeyou Istchee James Bay
Broadback River drainage basin